James Hartshorn (born 28 September 1997) is a New Zealand cricketer. He made his List A debut on 29 November 2020, for Wellington in the 2020–21 Ford Trophy. He made his first-class debut on 15 November 2021, for Wellington in the 2021–22 Plunket Shield season.

References

External links
 

1997 births
Living people
New Zealand cricketers
Wellington cricketers
Place of birth missing (living people)